Azhagiya Kanne is a 1982 Indian Tamil-language film written and directed by Mahendran. It was released on 17 December 1982.

Plot 
Bhama is a renowned dancer born into a devadasi family. She's constantly fending off unwanted sexual advances from prominent men in her village and is generally vexed at the state of her life. With the exception of her aunt Pechiamma, her entire family pushes her into sex work. Prasanna is a sculptor that greatly admires Bhama's dance and is kind to her. Bhama finds herself drawn to his kindness and proposes that they marry. He initially refuses but changes his mind when he realises her family will eventually force her into sex work. Worried about losing her and the money she could bring in, they take her to a corrupt samiyar to convince her to agree to sex work. He attempts to rape then kills her but tells her family she's agreed to sex work and left the country with a rich man. Prasanna is also told this and is heart-broken. He swears off sculpting and leaves town. Pechiamma is also devastated as she always thought of Bhama as her own child. Years later, Pechiamma's child Kasthoori – a miracle, late in life baby born after Bhama's death – has an uncanny knowledge of Bhama. She's wiser than her years and bears a strong hatred of the samiyar. The samiyar – convinced Bhama's spirit is in Kasthoori – leaves town. Kasthoori also runs away from home and befriends Prasanna. He's bewildered by this strange child that won't leave him alone and insists on helping him. Since losing Bhama, he's been wandering with little aim or direction in life. Kasthoori arranges for a place for them to stay and gets him a job. Prasanna adopts Kasthoori and gains a sense of responsibility and direction in his life. Lakshmi was engaged to marry Prasanna before he met Bhama and has been waiting for him. Kasthoori brings her to Prasanna and she joins their odd family. Kasthoori seems to know what will happen before it happens and creates a sense of unease in those around her. She's become prominent enough to garner interest from the press. Lakshmi is also increasingly at unease with Kasthoori. She convinces Prasanna to go to the samiyar – newly arrived in town- for guidance. Pechiamma and her husband also arrive in town searching for their daughter. Kasthoori finally finds herself in a position to exact revenge but must face multiple obstacles.

Cast 
 Baby Anju as Kasthoori
 Sarath Babu as Prasanna
 Sumalatha as Bhama
 Suhasini as Lakshmi
 Thengai Srinivasan
 Vennira Aadai Moorthy
 Charuhasan as Samiyar
 Senthamarai as the landlord
 Bayilvan Ranganathan
 Kullamani
 Kumarimuthu
 Ganthimathi as Pechiamma

Soundtrack 
The soundtrack was composed by Ilaiyaraaja, and the lyrics were written by Vaali and Gangai Amaran.

References

External links 
 

1980s Tamil-language films
1982 films
Films directed by Mahendran (filmmaker)
Films scored by Ilaiyaraaja